Valery Seleznev (born 5 September 1964, Vladivostok) is a Russian political figure and a deputy of the 5th, 6th, 7th, and 8th State Dumas.
 
In 1994, Seleznev engaged in business and founded the commercial company CVC. In 1998, he headed the "Australian Trading House" and the "Australian Trading Company" enterprises that engaged in foreign economic activity. In 2007, 2011, 2016, and 2021, he was elected deputy of the 5th, 6th, 7th, and 8th State Dumas.
 
In 2017, the United States convicted the son of Valery Seleznev, Roman Seleznev, of cybercrime and sentenced him to 27 years in prison. He was accused of stealing and selling 1.7 mln credit card numbers. Roman Seleznev was detained during his vacation in July 2014 at the international airport of the Maldives by the United States Intelligence Community.

References
 

 

1964 births
Living people
Liberal Democratic Party of Russia politicians
21st-century Russian politicians
Eighth convocation members of the State Duma (Russian Federation)
Seventh convocation members of the State Duma (Russian Federation)
Sixth convocation members of the State Duma (Russian Federation)
Fifth convocation members of the State Duma (Russian Federation)
Politicians from Vladivostok